The Tree of Immortality is the tree of life motif as it appears in the Quran. It is also alluded to in hadiths and tafsir. Unlike the biblical account, the Quran mentions only one tree in Eden, that was whispered to Adam by Satan as the tree of immortality, which Allah specifically forbade to Adam and Eve; in other words, there is no tree of knowledge in the Quran. The tree in the Quran is used as an example for a concept, idea, way of life or code of life. A good concept/idea is represented as a good tree and a bad idea/concept is represented as a bad tree. Satan appeared to them and told them that the only reason God forbade them to eat from that tree is that they would become angels (malak) or  start using the idea/concept of ownerships (mulk) in conjunction with inheritance generations after generations which Iblis convinced Adam to accept. 

The ahadith, however, speak about other trees in heaven.

See also
 Plants in Islam
 Sidrat al-Muntaha
 Tree of life (biblical)

References

Islamic belief and doctrine
Islamic terminology
Trees in Islam
Trees in mythology
Jannah